The Streltsovsk mine is a large open pit mine located in the southern part of Russia in Zabaykalsky Krai. Streltsovsk represents one of the largest uranium reserves in Russia having estimated reserves of 64.1 million tonnes of ore grading 0.2% uranium.

The caldera was the result of a peralkaline rhyolite magma eruption within a subalkaline granite.

References 

Uranium mines in Russia